Golf at the 2018 Asian Games was held at Pondok Indah Golf Course, Jakarta, Indonesia, from 23 to 26 August 2018 and featured four events: the men's individual and team events and women's individual and team events.

The event was open to amateur players only. Several national golf associations complained to the Court of Arbitration for Sport that Sri Lanka, Bangladesh, Macau and Uzbekistan had possibly entered professional golfers, but the CAS ruled that none of the players were professional.

Schedule

Medal summary

Medal table

Medalists

Participating nations
A total of 128 athletes from 25 nations competed in golf at the 2018 Asian Games:

References

External links
Golf at the 2018 Asian Games
Official Result Book – Golf

 
2018 Asian Games events
Asian Games
2018